Harold Bruce Ellingsen (born April 26, 1949) is an American former professional baseball player. In Major League Baseball, the left-handed pitcher worked in 16 games, including two starting assignments for the  Cleveland Indians.

Ellingsen spent six full seasons in the Dodgers' farm system before he was acquired by the Indians on April 3, 1974, in an ultimately one-sided transaction. For Ellingsen, the Indians gave up Pedro Guerrero, then a 17-year-old with one year of professional experience with the Rookie-classification Gulf Coast Indians. Guerrero would go on to play eleven seasons for the Dodgers (and 15 in all in the Major Leagues), slug 215 home runs, bat an even .300, and be selected to five National League All-Star teams.

Ellingsen began the 1974 season with the Triple-A Oklahoma City 89ers, but was recalled in July. His final two appearances in September were as a starting pitcher against the New York Yankees. In the first, on September 22 at Shea Stadium, he went seven innings and surrendered only six hits, but lost a pitchers' duel to the Yankees' Pat Dobson 2–1 when he gave up a sixth-inning home run to Bobby Murcer. In his second start, six days later at Cleveland Stadium, he gave up four hits and four earned runs in  innings, but did not factor in the decision in a 9–7 Cleveland loss.  Ellingsen then returned to minor league baseball in 1975 and retired from baseball following that season.

In 42 major league innings pitched, Ellingsen allowed 45 hits, 17 bases on balls and five home runs. He struck out 16.

References

External links

1949 births
Living people
Albuquerque Dukes players
Arizona Instructional League Dodgers players
Bakersfield Dodgers players
Baseball players from California
Baseball players from Idaho
Cleveland Indians players
Major League Baseball pitchers
Ogden Dodgers players
Oklahoma City 89ers players
People from Lakewood, California
Sportspeople from Pocatello, Idaho
Spokane Indians players